On Vodka, Beers and Regrets is a 2020 Filipino romantic drama film directed and written by Irene Villamor and starring Bela Padilla and JC Santos. This story is about an alcoholic 20-something who keeps on sabotaging herself, and a guy who makes a valiant effort to help her. The film was theatrically released on February 5, 2020.

Plot 
Jane (Bela Padilla) was a successful actress as a child and through her teenage years. However, after being involved in a scandal with another actor, her career had been on the wane. Since then, she would always take refuge under the influence of alcohol, which caused her to make destructive decisions in love and career.  One day, while having another drinking binge in a bar, she was noticed and befriended by Brisom frontman Francis (JC Santos) who then helped her get through that night, and several other nights to follow.

Cast 
Bela Padilla as Jane
JC Santos as Francis
Matteo Guidicelli as Ronnie
Kean Cipriano as Sam
Rio Locsin
Jasmine Hollingworth as Kelly
Danita Paner

Production
According to Bela Padilla, she calls Irene on the phone and told her that she wanted to make a movie again with her. This will serve as their third collaboration in a film after Camp Sawi and Meet Me in St. Gallen.

Release 
The film was theatrically released in the Philippines on February 5, 2020.

References 

Philippine romantic drama films
2020s Tagalog-language films
2020 films
Films directed by Irene Emma Villamor
2020 romantic drama films